The WTA Bratislava was a women's tennis tournament held in Bratislava, Slovakia, from 1999 until 2002. The tournament was a Tier IVa and V event on the WTA Tour. It was held in October and played on indoor hard courts at the Incheba expo centre. Amélie Mauresmo won her first career title in the inaugural event, defeating another future world No. 1, Kim Clijsters.

Past finals

Singles

Doubles

External links 
Tournament finals 2006-1971

Bratislava
Bratislava
Bratislava
Bratislava
Sport in Bratislava
Defunct tennis tournaments in Europe
Defunct sports competitions in Slovakia